Lahore Area Control Centre is one of two Area Control Centers in Pakistan operated by the Pakistan Civil Aviation Authority and based at Allama Iqbal International Airport in Lahore. Lahore ACC air traffic controllers provide en route and terminal control services to aircraft in the Lahore Flight Information Region (FIR). The Lahore FIR airspace covers Pakistani airspace between the 30° North to 37° North. To the south is the Karachi FIR. To the north is the Urumqi FIR. To the east is the Delhi FIR. To the west is the Kabul FIR.

Sectors
Lahore ACC is divided into three control sectors:
 Lahore Sector East
 Lahore Sector West Upper
 Lahore Sector West Lower (active between 1700 and 0100 UTC)

Services
Lahore ACC is equipped with Indra's Aircon 2100 radar system. and provides air traffic control services to all air traffic and its airspace. It also expedites sequencing of arrivals and departures along STARs (Standard Terminal Arrival Routes) and SIDs (Standard Instrument Departures). Certain exceptions include military airspace and lower-level airspace controlled by local airport towers and TRACONs, such as Cherat Approach. Lahore ACC is also part of the Bobcat Air Traffic Flow Management program, which helps to optimize traffic flow through Kabul FIR. Due to lower navigation and surveillance capabilities, and limited ATS provision capabilities, Kabul FIR often becomes very congested airspace with limited number of operating routes and flight levels. Whereas the level allocation is made by AeroThai, the primary responsibility for tactical management of level allocation rests with Lahore ACC.

Airports
The Lahore ACC assumes control of the following airports:

Controlled, IFR/IFR, IFR/VFR and VFR/VFR separation, VFR: Mode C and ATC clearance required
Lahore Allama Iqbal International Airport
Peshawar Bacha Khan International Airport
Islamabad International Airport
Faisalabad International Airport
Multan International Airport
Sialkot International Airport
Controlled, only IFR/IFR spacing
Bahawalpur Airport
Chitral Airport
Dera Ghazi Khan International Airport
Dera Ismail Khan Airport
Gilgit Airport
Rahim Yar Khan Shaikh Zayed International Airport
Skardu Airport
Uncontrolled, clearances are required to enter or leave airspace.
Chashma Airport
Chilas Airport
Lahore Walton Airport
Mangla Airport
Muzaffarabad Airport
Parachinar Airport
Rawalakot Airport
Saidu Sharif Airport
Tarbela Dam Airport
Zhob Airport

See also
Karachi Area Control Centre
Airports of Pakistan
Civil Aviation Authority

References

External links
 Civil Aviation Authority of Pakistan - Official site
 Lahore Air Traffic Control | LiveATC.net

Air traffic control centers
Air traffic control in Pakistan
Allama Iqbal International Airport
Aviation in Lahore
Lahore